Robert Victor "Bull" "Cyclone" Sullivan (December 10, 1919 - September 8, 1970) was an American college football coach. He was the head coach at East Mississippi Community College for 16 seasons, from 1950-52 and again from 1956-69. He was inducted into the Mississippi Sports Hall of Fame, and profiled in the 1984 Sports Illustrated article "The Toughest Coach There Ever Was". He was also the subject of the book Bull Cyclone Sullivan and the Lions of Scooba, Mississippi.

References

1919 births
1970 deaths
East Mississippi Lions football coaches
Players of American football from Alabama
Coaches of American football from Alabama
Junior college football coaches in the United States